Joseph Pletincx (1888 – 1971) was a Belgian water polo player. He competed at the 1908,  1912, 1920, and 1924 Summer Olympics and won three silver and one bronze medals, becoming one of eight male athletes who won four or more Olympic medals in water polo.

See also
 Belgium men's Olympic water polo team records and statistics
 List of multiple Olympic medalists in one event
 List of Olympic medalists in water polo (men)
 List of players who have appeared in multiple men's Olympic water polo tournaments
 List of members of the International Swimming Hall of Fame

References

External links

 

1888 births
1971 deaths
Belgian male water polo players
Water polo players at the 1908 Summer Olympics
Water polo players at the 1912 Summer Olympics
Water polo players at the 1920 Summer Olympics
Water polo players at the 1924 Summer Olympics
Olympic water polo players of Belgium
Olympic silver medalists for Belgium
Olympic bronze medalists for Belgium
Olympic medalists in water polo
Medalists at the 1924 Summer Olympics
Medalists at the 1920 Summer Olympics
Medalists at the 1912 Summer Olympics
Medalists at the 1908 Summer Olympics
Place of birth missing
20th-century Belgian people